is a retired Japanese flyweight freestyle wrestler. He competed at the 1976 and 1984 Olympics and won a gold and a bronze medal, respectively. Takada held the world title in 1974, 1975, 1977 and 1979. In 2005 he was inducted into the FILA Hall of Fame.

References

External links
 

1954 births
Living people
Olympic wrestlers of Japan
Wrestlers at the 1976 Summer Olympics
Wrestlers at the 1984 Summer Olympics
Japanese male sport wrestlers
Olympic gold medalists for Japan
Olympic bronze medalists for Japan
Nippon Sport Science University alumni
Olympic medalists in wrestling
Asian Games medalists in wrestling
Wrestlers at the 1974 Asian Games
Wrestlers at the 1978 Asian Games
World Wrestling Championships medalists
Medalists at the 1984 Summer Olympics
Medalists at the 1976 Summer Olympics
Recipients of the Medal with Purple Ribbon
Medalists at the 1974 Asian Games
Medalists at the 1978 Asian Games
Asian Games gold medalists for Japan
Asian Games silver medalists for Japan
20th-century Japanese people
21st-century Japanese people